Yakupitiyage Karunadasa is a Sri Lankan scholar in Buddhist Studies. His main areas of specialization are Early Buddhism and Theravada Abidhamma.

Education and career
Y. Karunadasa obtained a First Class Bachelor of Arts degree from the University of Ceylon in 1958, a Ph.D. from the University of London in 1963, and was awarded an honorary D.Litt. by the University of Kelaniya in 2002. He is an Emeritus Professor of the University of Kelaniya, where he served as Dean of the Faculty of Arts and as the Director of its Postgraduate Institute of Pali and Buddhist Studies. He has also served as the Bukkyo Dendo Kyokai Visiting Professor of Buddhist Studies at the School of Oriental and African Studies of the University of London, as Distinguished Numata Chair Professor at the University of Calgary, and as Tung Lin Kok Yuen Visiting Professor of Buddhist Studies at the University of Toronto. Currently he teaches at the Center of Buddhist Studies of the University of Hong Kong as the MaMa Charitable Foundation Visiting Professor.
 In 1997 he was felicitated with a volume of articles on Buddhist Studies written by his colleagues. In 2005 he was decorated with the title of Sri Lanka Sikhamani by the Government of Sri Lanka in recognition of his meritorious service to the country of his birth.

Publications

Books
The Buddhist Analysis of Matter, (reprinted), The Buddhist Research Society, Singapore, 1989, pp. I-XVIII, 1986.
The Dhamma Theory: Philosophical Cornerstone of the Abhidhamma, Wheel Publications No. 412/413, Buddhist Publication Society, Kandy, 1996.
The Atthakatha Correspondence Table, in collaboration with Sodo Mori and T. Endo, Pali Text Society, London, 1995 Mori, Sodo, Y. Karunadasa & Toshiichi Endo (1994). Pali Atthakatha Correspondence Table. Oxford: Pali Text Society.
Theravada Abhidhamma : its inquiry into the nature of conditioned reality Published by Centre for Buddhist Studies, Hong Kong University, 2010
Early Buddhist Teachings: The Middle Position in Theory and Practice Published by Centre for Buddhist Studies, Hong Kong University, 2013

References

External links
 Buddhist scholar draws crowd to campus for lecture on time and space
 A Thoughtful Life: Professor Karunadasa Looks Back on His Career, Teaching, and Buddhist Studies

Living people
1934 births
Sri Lankan scholars of Buddhism
Theravada Buddhism writers
Sri Lankan philosophers
Alumni of the University of London
Alumni of the University of Ceylon (Peradeniya)
Sinhalese academics
Sri Lankan Buddhists
Sri Lanka Sikhamani